Anton Bulla (17 April 1901 – 9 December 1987) was a Slovak professional footballer and coach who played as a forward.

Career
Bulla played club football for ČsŠK Bratislava, turning professional in 1928. After he retired from playing, Bulla became a manager, leading his former club ŠK Slovan Bratislava in 1953.

References

1901 births
1987 deaths
Czechoslovak footballers
Association football forwards
First Vienna FC players
AC Sparta Prague players
ŠK Slovan Bratislava players
Czechoslovak football managers
ŠK Slovan Bratislava managers
MŠK Žilina managers
Czechoslovak expatriate footballers
Czechoslovak expatriate sportspeople in Austria
Expatriate footballers in Austria
Expatriate football managers in Austria